The Skidegate Band Council, also known as the Skidegate First Nation, is a band government of the Haida people, one of two of the Haida Tribal Society aka the Council of the Haida Nation.  Its offices are located in Skidegate, British Columbia.

Indian reserves
Indian reserves under the administration of the Skidegate Band Council are:
Cumshewa 7, north shore of Cumshewa Inlet west of McCoy Cove, east side of Moresby Island, .
Deena 3, south shore of Skidegate Inlet on north side of South Bay, north end of Moresby Island, .
Kaste 6, at mouth of Copper Creek, on Copper bay, northeast coast of Moresby Island, .
Khrana 4, east end of Maude Island, in Skidegate Inlet, between Graham and Moresby Islands, .
Lagins 5, mouth of Lagins Creek at head of Graham Island, Skidegate Inlet, .
New Clew 10, on north shore of Louise Island, .
Skedance 8, on east tip of Louise Island,  (near, but not at the site, of the village of Skedans).
Skidegate 1, at Skidegate Mission, mouth of Skidegate Inlet, southeast of Graham Island, .
Tanoo 9, east shore of Tanoo Island, .

References
First Nation Detail, Indian and Northern Affairs Canada
Reserves/Settlements/Villages Detail, Indian and Northern Affairs Canada

External links
band website

Haida governments
Haida Gwaii